Hopewell (also, New Hopewell) is an unincorporated community in Cleburne County, Alabama, United States. It lies at an elevation of 1060 feet (323 m).

References

Unincorporated communities in Cleburne County, Alabama
Unincorporated communities in Alabama